James Caldwall,  (1739–1822) was an English draughtsman and engraver.

Life

Caldwall was born in London in 1739, and  studied under John Keyse Sherwin.  He is known mainly for his  portraits, although he also engraved genre and military subjects. He employed a  technique which combined both  engraving and etching. Between 1768 and 1780 he exhibited 29 works at the Free Society of Artists and one at the Society of Artists. He died in 1822.

His brother, John Caldwall, who died in 1819, was a miniature painter who worked in Scotland.

Works
Caldwall's works include:

Portraits
Sir Henry Oxenden, Bart.
Katherine, Countess of Suffolk
Sir John Glynne, Chief Justice of the King's Bench. (pictured)
Sir Roger Curtis; after William Hamilton
Admiral Keppel
John Gillies, LL.D., historian
David Hume, historian
Mrs. Siddons and her Son, in the character of Isabella; after William Hamilton. 1783

Other subjects
The Immortality of Garrick; after Carter, the figures engraved by Caldwall, and the landscape by S. Smith. 1783
The Fete Champêtre given by the Earl of Derby at the Oaks; after R. Adams, engraved by Caldwall and Charles Grignion
The Camp at Coxheath; after William Hamilton. 1778

References

Sources
 

1739 births
1822 deaths
Artists from London
English engravers